The Turysh is a river in Sverdlovsk Oblast, Russia, a right tributary of the Irgina which in turn is a tributary of Sylva.

References 

Rivers of Sverdlovsk Oblast